The Port of Dubuque (also known as the Ice Harbor, 4th Street Peninsula, or the Riverfront) is the section of downtown Dubuque, Iowa that lies immediately adjacent to the Mississippi River. The area was among the first areas settled in what would become the City of Dubuque, and the State of Iowa. Historically, the area has been a center of heavy industry, but has recently seen extensive reinvestment and new construction. The area is now one of the main tourist destinations in Dubuque, as well as Iowa.

The Port of Dubuque includes all of the area that lies north of the CCPR rail yards, south of East 9th Street and Dove Harbor, east of the CCPR/ICER railroad tracks, and west of the Mississippi River. It is divided into two main sections: the North Port and the South Port, which are separated by the Ice Harbor.

The Port area is separated from Downtown Dubuque's central business district by a double set of railroad tracks and an expressway that carries U.S. highways 151 & 61. The North Port can be accessed via East 5th Street, or the East 3rd Street overpass, while the South Port is accessible from Jones Street, or Ice Harbor Drive—which connects the two ports together.

As of 2006, all of the redevelopment in the area has occurred in the North Port, and the South Port remains largely industrial or underutilized. This may be due to the anticipated construction of a new Mississippi river bridge, which will be built in the near future, alongside the Julien Dubuque Bridge.

History
The Port of Dubuque was one of the first areas settled in what is now Downtown Dubuque. Its proximity to the river made the area convenient for a variety of industrial uses, including boat building, lumber transportation and storage, and ice harvesting. The 1868 opening of the first Dubuque Railroad Bridge to Illinois also strengthened the Port's role as a center for heavy industry. In addition to these purposes, the Port was a major landing site for many of the steamboats which traveled on the river.  However, for most of its history, the low-lying Port area was unprotected against the frequent spring flooding of the Mississippi. For this reason, much of the city's commercial and retail businesses were built farther inland, centered on West 9th and Main Streets.

The Port area was an ideal location for some of the city's early manufacturing companies, however. In the 19th and early 20th centuries, Dubuque was a major boat building center on the Mississippi River, and this industry was centered on the Port area and the Ice Harbor. Alongside boat building, the Port was home to lumber yards, the Dubuque Star Brewery, and a Civil War-era Shot Tower.

The region also has long been a transportation center in Dubuque. U.S. highways 20, 151, 61, 52, and Iowa Highway 3 all converge in the Port of Dubuque. Also, the Chicago Central and Pacific and Iowa, Chicago and Eastern railroads run through the Port area. The current Dubuque Railroad Bridge, built in the 1890s, connected the city with population centers to the east. The Ice Harbor and Mississippi shoreline were the site of steamboat arrivals and departures in the city, and three of the city's four train stations were located in or near the area.

In 1943, the Julien Dubuque Bridge was completed south of the Ice Harbor, thereby moving vehicular traffic over the Port, instead of through it, across the old Dubuque "High" Bridge. Following a record-breaking flood in 1965, the City of Dubuque began construction on a  flood protection wall to protect all of the city's riverfront from the seasonal flooding of the Mississippi River. This was completed in 1973. Boat building ended in the area in the early 1970s, and brewing came to a halt shortly after.

The Port of Dubuque remained largely inactive until 1990. At that time, Iowa legalized riverboat gambling and the "Casino Belle" opened, afloat in the Ice Harbor. That boat would be replaced in the mid-1990s by the Diamond Jo Casino, named after Dubuque boatbuilder "Diamond" Joe Reynolds and his Diamond Jo Boat Line.

In the late 1990s, the City of Dubuque saw an opportunity to expand on the  existing tourism market by adding a major river-themed museum to the area. Alongside a new museum, the city proposed a new hotel and indoor water park attraction, a large convention center, riverwalk, and other amenities. This was all part of the "America's River Project," a $188 million revitalization of the North Port. In the early 2000s, the city won a huge $40 million grant from the "Vision Iowa" Fund for the construction of the various attractions.

The port today
Today, the Port of Dubuque is a rapidly changing area. In recent years, there has been a great deal of new construction, and much of the remaining vacant land has already been earmarked for more new development. Although the district has a strong emphasis on tourist attractions, there are retail, office, and residential projects included in proposed developments. Projects currently underway include the construction of a new office for McGraw Hill, and a new headquarters for The Durrant Group (a Dubuque architectural firm).

With the presence of various attractions, the Port has also become a natural gathering place for people. During the summer, the area hosts the annual America's River Festival, the Taste of Dubuque, and appearances by presidential candidates, among other events.

The revitalization of the Port of Dubuque has also led to a "ripple effect" of new development in Downtown Dubuque. Recently, buildings and storefronts along Main Street, especially south of 3rd Street, have been renovated with tourist-friendly restaurants, stores, and nightspots. This area, known as "Historic Old Main" or "Lower Main," together with the city's Cable Car Square Historic District, are forming an active shopping and entertainment district. Tourists are also being drawn to cultural attractions in Downtown Dubuque, including the Grand Opera House, the Five Flags Center, Fourth Street Elevator, and the Dubuque Museum of Art, among others.

Major attractions and sites

Port of Dubuque Marina

Port of Dubuque Marina Website
The City of Dubuque has completed a $4.1 million project that includes a new 78-slip marina and amenities building. The Port of Dubuque Marina opened for business on June 1, 2013 and is a 100% transient marina in the heart of Downtown Dubuque. In addition to the docks, the Port of Dubuque Marina includes private boater restrooms with shower and laundry facilities, public restrooms and a convenience store that offers a wide selection of items. The Port of Dubuque Marina is located in the historic Ice Harbor just south of the Dubuque Rail Bridge, and north of the Julien Dubuque (US HWY 20) bridge.

Diamond Jo Casino

Diamond Jo Casino Website
The Diamond Jo Casino includes 777 slot machines, 17 table games, and several restaurants. The casino is the among the largest attractions in the area.

Grand Harbor Resort & Waterpark

Grand Harbor Resort & Waterpark Website
The Grand Harbor Resort & Waterpark is a 193-room, family-oriented hotel complex. The facility is connected to the Grand River Center, and features a  water park as its main attraction. Many of its rooms have excellent views of the Mississippi River and Downtown Dubuque.

Grand River Center

Grand River Center Website
The Grand River Center is Dubuque's largest convention center. The facility features  of meeting space, and regularly plays host to weddings, car shows, regional conventions, and presidential candidates. It is connected by skywalk to the Grand Harbor Resort & Waterpark, and features underground parking, high-speed internet, and catering services.

National Mississippi River Museum & Aquarium

National Mississippi River Museum & Aquarium Website
The National Mississippi River Museum & Aquarium is the signature attraction in the Port of Dubuque. Affiliated with the Smithsonian Institution, the museum is the largest of its kind, and includes dozens of interactive, family-friendly exhibits. The complex also has a large aquarium component, including turtles, otters, fish, and other wildlife found along the river. In addition to these, the facility has theaters, a working wetland, and the restored William M. Black Dredgeboat for tourists to explore.

McGraw Hill, LLC
In October 2007, McGraw Hill opened its new $32 million, 4-story office complex in the Port. The new building houses the headquarters of the company's Higher Education Division, and 400 employees. The structure is located at the NW corner of East 5th & Bell Streets.

Mississippi Riverwalk
The Mississippi Riverwalk is a 1/2 mile long walkway along the Mississippi riverbank in the Port of Dubuque. It runs from the Ice Harbor in the south to the Dubuque Rail Bridge and Alliant Energy Amphitheater in the north. The walkway is situated atop Dubuque's flood protection levee and provides excellent views of both the Mississippi River and Downtown Dubuque. It includes the American Trust and Savings Bank River's Edge Plaza, benches, and numerous informational displays detailing the history of the Port of Dubuque.

The Riverwalk is one part of a series of riverfront trails and walkways recently completed by the City of Dubuque. The trail system will, in its finality, be interconnected and link up the various parks and tourist attractions along Dubuque's Mississippi Riverfront.

Shot Tower

The Dubuque Shot Tower is a National Historic Landmark, originally used to produce lead shot for the U.S. military's muskets. After many years of service, including munitions production during the American Civil War, it later served as a fire watchtower for a lumber yard located at the site. It was built in 1856, and is located at what is now the northern end of Bell Street, near the Dubuque Railroad Bridge. The Shot Tower is among the oldest surviving structures in Dubuque.

After many years of neglect following the demise of Dubuque's lumber industry, the tower is now being studied for planned repair costs. It will almost certainly see major repairs and restoration as a part of the riverfront revitalization effort.

Spirit of Dubuque
The dual paddlewheeler Spirit of Dubuque was designed by Dubuque-native Robert Kehl, with the help of a New Orleans marine engineering firm in 1976. The Spirit is a replica of a century-old Mississippi River steamboat with Victorian decor. She made her  maiden voyage in spring 1977, with eight cases of bananas. Captain Walt and Nancy Webster have owned the Spirit of Dubuque since May 1994 and now operate a sightseeing company with the boat. The  boat can carry 377 passengers.

Future of the port

America's River Project: Phase II
Diamond Jo Casino:
The Diamond Jo Casino is currently building a new $78 million casino and entertainment complex in the Port. The new complex will replace the casino's current riverboat gambling facility with a land-based  casino. The new casino will have 990 slot machines, 17 table games, a poker room, a 36-lane bowling & entertainment center, and 3 restaurants. The  complex will open in the fall of 2008, and will sit at the NW corner of East 3rd & Bell Streets.

National Mississippi River Museum & Aquarium:
The National Mississippi River Museum & Aquarium is planning a $38 million expansion involving several components. When the Diamond Jo moves into its new casino, the museum plans to renovate the Diamond Jo's Portside Building into the "Great Rivers Center," which will include a "National Rivers Center," a "Rivers Research Center," additional exhibit space, and retail space. The museum will also build a new 250-seat IMAX-like "RiverMax Theater," showcasing 3-D and 4-D films. Besides museum-related movies, the theater will also show up to 8 non-museum-related films per year. In addition to these projects, the museum will take over the Diamond Jo's existing riverboat, but has yet to announce a planned use for the vessel. The complex will likely be complete in 2010, when fundraising has been finished. The various complexes are located on the SW and SE corners of East 3rd & Bell Streets.

City of Dubuque projects
Port of Dubuque Park:
The City of Dubuque is planning to build a new public park in the Port. While no specific location has been announced, it will likely be located to the north of the McGraw-Hill office complex, near East 5th & Bell Streets.

Public parking ramp:
The City of Dubuque and the Diamond Jo Casino are currently building a new 1,130 space, $23 million parking ramp in the Port. The ramp is set to open in the fall of 2008, coinciding with the opening of the Diamond Jo's new casino. It will be the largest parking structure in the city, and will sit near the planned casino expansion at East 3rd & Bell Streets.

Durrant Group Inc.
Dubuque-based architectural/engineering firm The Durrant Group is renovating the former Adams Company building and move their new corporate headquarters there. The , $3 million project is being developed in partnership with Dubuque developer Wayne Briggs and his planned Port developments. Work is currently underway, and will likely wrap up in December 2007. The building is located at East 5th Street & Ice Harbor Drive.

Portside Plaza
A team of investors led by Dubuque-based developer Wayne Briggs is planning to build "Portside Plaza," a mixed-use development consisting of condominiums, offices, and retail stores in the Port. Retail space will occupy the first floor of the buildings (50,000 ft²), with office space above them on the second through fourth floors (200,000 ft²), and condos priced between $200,000-$600,000+ on the uppermost levels. This project also includes redevelopment of the Adams Company Building for The Durrant Group's headquarters. Construction will likely begin in late 2007, and be completed in phases. However, as recent news releases indicate, there is a high flow of interest from companies wishing to move in. This may cause the entire project to be completed in one phase, with the opening date as early as 2009. The buildings will be built at the SW corner of East 5th & Bell Streets.

Star Brewery

The former Dubuque Star Brewing Co. building is being renovated for commercial, retail, and office uses. The $6.5 million project, led by Dubuque-based developer Wayne Briggs, includes the recently opened  winery and wine tasting room for Dubuque County's Stone Cliff Winery. In October 2007, Kurtz Communications Co. will begin operations on the building's 4th & 5th floors, and in 2007, "The Star," a large new restaurant, opened. It closed on 2-18-13. The complex is located north of the Grand River Center, on Star Brewery Drive.

See also
 Parks in Dubuque, Iowa

References

External links
America's River Project Website
America's River Project (phase 2 details)
Port of Dubuque Renovation Guide
National Mississippi River Museum & Aquarium
Diamond Jo Casino
Grand Harbor Resort & Waterpark
Grand River Center (convention center)
City of Dubuque - Official Website

Economy of Dubuque, Iowa
Buildings and structures in Dubuque, Iowa
Culture of Dubuque, Iowa
Parks in Dubuque, Iowa
Tourist attractions in Dubuque, Iowa
River ports of the United States